Bernard "Bajdo" Vukas (1 May 1927 – 4 April 1983) was a Croatian football player during Yugoslavia.

Vukas played as a left winger/forward and is mostly remembered for his extraordinary dribbling ability. In 2000, he was voted by the Croatian Football Federation as the best Croatian player of all Time, and in a poll by Večernji List, he was voted the best Croatian athlete of the 20th century.

Club career
Vukas started his career in the youth ranks of Concordia Zagreb. After WW2, he spent some time in NK Amater Zagreb before moving to Hajduk Split in 1947. He stayed in Hajduk until 1957, playing 202 games and scoring 89 goals. With Hajduk, Vukas won the Yugoslav First League title on three occasions, in 1950, 1952 and 1955, and he was the league's top scorer in the 1954–55 season with 20 goals. In 1950, Vukas helped Hajduk win the Yugoslav First League undefeated, a record which has never been broken.

In 1957, he moved to Bologna F.C. 1909, where he stayed for two years playing 48 games and scoring two goals, but his time there was overshadowed by serious illness. He returned to Hajduk in 1959 and remained until 1963, playing 65 games and scoring 5 goals. He spent his last days as a football player in Austria, playing for Austria Klagenfurt, Grazer AK and Kapfenberger SV.

Counting friendlies, Vukas played a total of 615 games for Hajduk Split and scored 300 goals.

On 23 October 1953, Vukas, along with Branko Zebec, Vladimir Beara and Zlatko Čajkovski, played for FIFA's 'Rest of the World' team against England at Wembley – in a match to celebrate 90 years of English Football Association. The match ended 4–4, with Vukas assisting in two goals and being awarded a penalty. Two years later, on 13 August 1955, Vukas was invited to play for the UEFA Team in a friendly match against Great Britain played in Belfast, where Vukas scored a hat trick.

He died of a heart attack on 4 April 1983, aged 55. There are streets in Split and Zagreb named after him.

International career
He made his debut for Yugoslavia in a June 1948 Balkan Cup match against Albania and earned a total of 59 caps, scoring 22 goals. He was also a part of the Yugoslavian team in the 1950 and 1954 FIFA World Cups. With Yugoslavia he won 2 silver medals in the Olympic games. His final international was a May 1957 Central European International Cup match against Czechoslovakia.

Honours
 In Hajduk, Vukas won Yugoslav league titles three times, 1950, 1952 and 1955, whereupon the championship of 1950 was achieved without a defeat. This record is still alive.
 Twice the Yugoslav national team including Bernard Vukas won the silver medal at the Olympic Games (1948 and 1952).
 In the 1954–55 season, he led the Yugoslav league as the top goalscorer, with 20 goals.
 He played 615 games for Hajduk Split and scored 300 times.
 On 21 October 1953, he played in Wembley for the "Rest of the World" team against England. The final result was 4–4.
 On 13 August 1955, he was invited to play for the UEFA team (Continental Team) in Belfast against Great Britain. The game ended 4–1 with a hat trick by Vukas.
 He was also a part of the Yugoslavia team in the 1950 FIFA World Cup and 1954 FIFA World Cup.
 In 2000, he was elected for the best Croatian football player of all times.

References

External links
 

Profile at Serbian football federation

1927 births
1983 deaths
Footballers from Zagreb
Association football forwards
Yugoslav footballers
Yugoslavia international footballers
1950 FIFA World Cup players
1954 FIFA World Cup players
Olympic footballers of Yugoslavia
Footballers at the 1948 Summer Olympics
Footballers at the 1952 Summer Olympics
Olympic medalists in football
Medalists at the 1952 Summer Olympics
Medalists at the 1948 Summer Olympics
Olympic silver medalists for Yugoslavia
NK Zagreb players
HNK Hajduk Split players
Bologna F.C. 1909 players
FC Kärnten players
Grazer AK players
Kapfenberger SV players
Yugoslav First League players
Serie A players
Austrian Football Bundesliga players
Yugoslav expatriate footballers
Expatriate footballers in Italy
Yugoslav expatriate sportspeople in Italy
Expatriate footballers in Austria
Yugoslav expatriate sportspeople in Austria
Burials at Mirogoj Cemetery